Baseball at the Australian University Games has been part of the Australian University Games program since the 2004 games. The games are held in the last week of September during mid-Semester break. The reigning champions and most successful team is The University of Sydney who are members of the Sydney Uni Baseball Club.

History
The first university baseball was established by the Sydney Uni Baseball Club when it formed in 1899. By 1904, it was playing in the New South Wales Baseball Association Second Grade. The next earliest reports of university baseball was the University of Melbourne playing in the Victorian league in 1908. Inter-varsity baseball started in Australia in 1923 when Sydney, Adelaide and Melbourne played a triangular inter-varsity series.

List of Champions

Historical results
1923 – Adelaide
1924 – Sydney
1925 – Sydney
1926 – Sydney
1927 – Sydney
1928 – Adelaide/Sydney
1931 – Adelaide

Wollongong 1994
The 1994 Australian University Games were hosted by the University of Wollongong. The baseball was held at Fred Finch Reserve at Berkeley, Wollongong. A massive 16 teams from around Australia participated.
The finals were contested with – 
The University of Newcastle winning Gold against the University of Melbourne, Silver.
The University of Wollongong won the Bronze medal beating the University of New South Wales coming in 4th.

Perth 2004
The 2004 Australian University Games were held in Perth, Western Australia. Edith Cowan University won the gold medal match over Monash University. 
University of Wollongong won bronze over University of Western Australia.

14 teams participated including University of Wollongong, University of Sydney, University of Ballarat, University of Western Sydney, RMIT University, University of New South Wales, University of Queensland, Queensland University of Technology, Melbourne University, Monash University and University of Notre Dame Australia.

Brisbane 2005
The 2005 Australian University Games was hosted in Brisbane, Queensland. Griffith University were the overall winners, while the Queensland University of Technology won the baseball sports program.

Results

Adelaide 2006
The 2006 Australian University Games was hosted in Adelaide, South Australia. The University of Adelaide, University of South Australia and Flinders University were the overall winners, while the University of Sydney won the baseball sports program.

Results

Gold Coast 2007
The 2007 Australian University Games was hosted on the Gold Coast, Queensland. Griffith University were the overall winners, while the University of Western Australia won the baseball sports program. The baseball program was split into two divisions.

Results

Melbourne 2008
The 2008 Australian University Games was hosted in Melbourne. Victoria University and Monash University were the overall winners, while the University of Melbourne won the baseball sports program. Silver went to The University of Sydney.

Gold Coast 2009
The 2009 Australian University Games were held on the Gold Coast, Queensland from 27 September – 2 October between 8 teams.

The University of Sydney won gold at with an 8–5 victory over Griffith University at Sir Bruce Small Park.

Perth 2010
The 2010 Australian University Games were held at Perth, Western Australia from 26 September to 1 October 2010. University of Sydney defeated Monash University 8–7 for the gold medal.  The games had the lowest number of entrants since its inception, with only hosts University of Western Australia and bronze medallists University of Melbourne being the other two entrants.

Gold Coast 2011
The 2011 Australian University Games were held on the Gold Coast, Queensland from 25 to 30 September 2011. There was a total of 10 teams competing with Monash University defeating University of Queensland 8–7 in the final game. Griffith University won the bronze.

Adelaide 2012
The 2012 Australian University Games were hosted in Adelaide, South Australia from 23 to 28 September 2012. A total of 10 teams competing with University of Melbourne defeating University of Newcastle 9–2. The previous year's winners Monash University were awarded the bronze.

Gold Coast 2013
The 2013 Australian University Games were hosted on the Gold Coast, Queensland from 29 September to 4 October 2013. A total of 12 teams competed, the most since 2007, with University of Melbourne defeating Monash University 9–5 to win their second consecutive gold. Griffith University won the bronze.

Sydney 2014
The 2014 Australian University Games were held in Sydney, the first time since 2001, from 28 September to 3 October 2014 with 10 teams competing.  The University of Sydney won gold with a 15–10 win over Monash University in the championship game, while The University of Melbourne defeated University of Newcastle 13–3 in the bronze medal match.

Gold Coast 2015
The 2015 Australian University Games were hosted on the Gold Coast, Queensland from 28 September to 2 October 2015. A total of 13 teams competed, the most since 2013, with Griffith University defeating University of Sydney 9–4 to win their first gold medal since 2005. Queensland University of Technology won the bronze with a 9–8 win over Monash University.

Perth 2016
The 2016 Australian University Games will be held in Perth, Western Australia from 26 to 30 September 2016.  A total of 9 teams will compete in the tournament being held at Kingsway Regional Sporting Complex, the home of the Wanneroo Giants Baseball Club.

See also
Baseball in Australia
Australian University Games
Australia National Youth Championships (baseball)
Baseball awards#Australia

References

External links
Australian University Games Baseball

Univ
Sport at Australian universities
Baseball